Dick Lundy is the name of:

 Dick Lundy (animator) (1907–1990), American animator and film director
 Dick Lundy (baseball) (1898–1962), Negro leagues baseball player